Fusinus multicarinatus is a species of sea snail, a marine gastropod mollusk in the family Fasciolariidae, the spindle snails, the tulip snails and their allies.

Description

Distribution

References

 Finet Y. & Snyder M.A. (2012). Illustrations and taxonomic placement of the Recent Fusus and Fasciolaria in the Lamarck collection of the Muséum d’Histoire Naturelle, Geneva (Caenogastropoda, Buccinoidea, Gastropoda). Zootaxa. 3507: 1–37

External links

multicarinatus
Gastropods described in 1822